Niphargellus is a genus of amphipod crustaceans within the family Niphargidae.

A cladogram according to the Catalogue of Life:

Species list 
Niphargellus arndti
Niphargellus glenniei
Niphargellus nolli

References

Niphargidae
Malacostraca genera